Morrisvale is an unincorporated community and coal town in Boone County, West Virginia, United States.

The community derives its name from Page Morris, a coal-mining official.

References

Unincorporated communities in Boone County, West Virginia
Unincorporated communities in West Virginia
Coal towns in West Virginia